Bloom is a 2003 Irish film written and directed by Sean Walsh, based on the 1922 novel Ulysses by James Joyce. The film premiered at the 2003 Taormina Film Festival. Angeline Ball won the award for "Best Actress in a Film" at the Irish Film and Television Awards. The soundtrack was written and produced by David Kahne.

Premise
Bloom takes place on 16 June 1904 and attempts to make a visual reconstruction of Joyce's stream of consciousness style.

Cast 
 Stephen Rea as Leopold Bloom
 Angeline Ball as Molly Bloom
 Hugh O'Conor as Stephen Dedalus
 Mark Huberman as Haines
 Eoin McCarthy as Blazes Boylan
 Alvaro Lucchesi as Buck Mulligan
 Patrick Bergin as Citizen

References

External links 

2003 films
Adultery in films
English-language Irish films
Films based on Irish novels
Films relating to James Joyce
Films set in 1904
Films set in Dublin (city)
Films shot in the Republic of Ireland
Ulysses (novel)
2000s English-language films